Eduardo Sepulveda Puerto is a Spanish épée fencer.

Sepulveda Puerto won the silver medal in the épée team event at the 2006 World Fencing Championships after losing to France in the final. He accomplished this with his team mates Ignacio Canto, Juan Castaneda and Jose Luis Abajo.

Achievements
 2006 World Fencing Championships, team épée

References

Living people
Year of birth missing (living people)
Spanish male épée fencers
Place of birth missing (living people)
Mediterranean Games medalists in fencing
Mediterranean Games bronze medalists for Spain
Competitors at the 2001 Mediterranean Games